Leninsky is a rural locality (a settlement) in Chernushinsky District, Perm Krai, Russia. The population was 5 as of 2010. There is 1 street.

Geography 
Leninsky is located 42 km northeast of Chernushka (the district's administrative centre) by road. Kalinovka is the nearest rural locality.

References 

Rural localities in Chernushinsky District